Rick Rudeen (born June 5, 1962) is a former professional tennis player from the United States.

Biography
Rudeen was born in Chicago and grew up in Tampa, Florida. In the early 1980s he attended Clemson University, where he played collegiate tennis while he studied for a Computer Science degree. An All-American player, he won a total of 172 NCAA Division I matches during his tennis career at Clemson University.

In 1985 he began competing professionally and that year made the round of 16 at the Tokyo Outdoor Grand Prix tournament, by beating Danny Saltz then Menno Oosting. It was as a doubles player he made more success, with one Grand Prix final, at Auckland in 1986, with regular doubles partner Karl Richter. He made it to 110 in the world in doubles, won two Challenger titles and played in the main draws of both the Australian Open and US Open. His first appearance at the US Open in 1986 came in unusual circumstances when he and partner Derek Tarr were given a place in the first round as lucky losers after the pairing of Peter Fleming and John McEnroe got stuck in traffic and were defaulted for not arriving in time. At the 1987 Australian Open, Rudeen reached the second round of both men's and mixed doubles events.

Retiring in 1988, Rudeen got married and was a tennis pro in Minneapolis for about a year before moving to Atlanta. He was Director of the Ralston/Gorman International Tennis Academy until 1993, then moved to Sioux City and worked for a long period of time with Gateway. Rudeen, who has a son and a daughter, now lives in Dakota Dunes, South Dakota.

Grand Prix career finals

Doubles: 1 (0–1)

Challenger titles

Doubles: (2)

References

External links
 
 

1962 births
Living people
American male tennis players
Tennis players from Chicago
Tennis players from Tampa, Florida
Clemson Tigers men's tennis players